Erythranthe laciniata, synonym Mimulus laciniatus, is an uncommon species of flowering plant known by the common name cutleaf monkeyflower, it is endemic to the High Sierra Nevada in California.

Description
Erythranthe laciniata is an annual herb producing a mostly hairless stem reaching maximum heights between 3 and 38 centimeters. The oppositely arranged leaves are up to 5 centimeters in length and generally oval in shape, though some of them are divided into lobes. The inflorescence is a raceme of several tiny red-spotted yellow flowers each 4 millimeters to 1.5 centimeters long. The tubular base of each flower is encapsulated in a ribbed, reddish calyx of sepals.

Distribution
Erythranthe laciniata is endemic to the High Sierra Nevada in California, where it most often grows in moist areas on granitic soils.

References

External links
Jepson Manual Treatment
USDA Plants Profile
Photo gallery

laciniata
Endemic flora of California
Flora of the Sierra Nevada (United States)
Flora without expected TNC conservation status